Ohio's 6th senatorial district has always been based in Dayton, Ohio. It consists of about two-thirds of Montgomery County.  It encompasses Ohio House districts 40, 41 and 42. It has a Cook PVI of R+9.  Its current Ohio Senator is Republican Niraj Antani.  He resides in Miamisburg, Ohio, a city located in  Montgomery County, Ohio

List of senators

External links
Ohio's 6th district senator at the 130th Ohio General Assembly official website

Ohio State Senate districts
Dayton, Ohio